Bert Kelly is the name of:

 Bert Kelly (1912–1997), Australian politician and magazine columnist
 Bert Kelly (jazz musician) (1882–1968), American jazz musician and bandleader

See also
Albert Kelly (born 1991), Australian rugby player
Robert Kelly (disambiguation)
Bertram Kelly (1884–1976), British electrical engineer
Burt Kelly (producer) (1898-1983), film producer and writer
Herbert Kelly (disambiguation)